24 Hour Roadside Resistance is an album by American political-ska punk band Against All Authority; first released in 2000.

The album contains a two-and-a-half minute spoken word track (the second half of 'The Source of Strontium 90') from a member of the Radiation and Public Health Project about the risks of radioactive fallout from nuclear power plants for children in South Florida.

Track listing

Personnel 
 Danny Lore - Vocals/Bass
 Joe Koontz - Guitar/Vocals
 Fin Leavell - Bass Trombone
 Spikey Goldbach - Drums

Notes
Artwork by Omar Angulo

References

2000 albums
Against All Authority albums
Hopeless Records albums